= Kot Ghulam Muhammad railway station =

Railway station in Pakistan

Kot Ghulam Muhammad railway station ڪوٽ غلام محمد ريلوي اسٽيشن

General information
- Owner: Ministry of Railways

Other information
- Station code: KGM

History
- Former names: Great Indian Peninsula Railway

Kot Ghulam Muhammad railway station (Urdu: کوٹ غلام محمد ریلوے اسٹیشن, Sindhi: ڪوٽ غلام محمد ريلوي اسٽيشن) is located in Pakistan.

== See also ==
- List of railway stations in Pakistan
- Pakistan Railways
